is Japanese idol group AKB48's ninth single, and the seventh major single released through DefSTAR Records, on January 23, 2008. This song was sung with 16 "Senbatsu" members, six members more than the previous single "Yūhi o Miteiru ka?". Therefore, five members were chosen as Senbatsu members again, and Ayaka Kikuchi was selected for the first time.

Team A - Tomomi Itano, Haruna Kojima, Atsuko Maeda, Minami Minegishi, Mai Oshima, Yukari Sato, Mariko Shinoda, Minami Takahashi, Hana Tojima
Team K - Sayaka Akimoto, Tomomi Kasai, Sae Miyazawa, Erena Ono, Yuko Oshima
Team B - Ayaka Kikuchi, Mayu Watanabe

Promotion
"Romance, Irane" was the third single released within 4 month since "BINGO!"'s release.

Video clip of "Romance, Irane" was filmed by Wataru Takeishi, who filmed a music clip of "BINGO!". Video clip was filmed at a studio in Tokyo Tower.

As same as previous single "Yūhi o Miteiru ka?", CDs were released in 3 different editions. Each of  included a bonus DVDs with "Romance, Irane"'s video clip and its making clip, but  and  did not include giveaway.

Although not chosen as Senbatsu members, Kayo Noro from Team K and Natsuki Sato from Team B were appeared on video clip as well as TV commercial.

Reception
The single charted 5 weeks in the top 200 with the highest rank at #6. "Romance, Irane"  sold 23,209 copies during its 5 weeks on the Oricon charts.

Track listing

Charts

Reported sales

References 

AKB48 songs
2008 singles
Songs with lyrics by Yasushi Akimoto
Defstar Records singles
2008 songs